This is a list of landfills in the United States. A landfill is a site for the disposal of waste materials by burial and is the oldest form of waste treatment. Historically, landfills have been the most common method of organized waste disposal and remain so in many places around the world. Superfund sites are recognized by the government as being contaminated with hazardous substances as well as broadly defined "pollutants or contaminants" and in need of cleanup.

California
 Canal Area, San Rafael, California – The "East San Rafael" area (the eastern portion of the Canal Area between the Bay and San Quentin Ridge) was home to most of the garbage disposal sites in central Marin County.
 Eastlake Landfill, Clearlake
 Frank R. Bowerman Landfill, Orange County
 Fresno Municipal Sanitary Landfill, Fresno
 Junipero Serra Landfill, Colma, closed in 1983
 Kettleman Hills Hazardous Waste Facility, southwest of Kettleman City
 Newby Island landfill, Santa Clara County
 Olinda Landfill, Orange County
 Puente Hills Landfill, Los Angeles County, the largest landfill in the country (closed)
 Redwood Landfill, Marin County (Novato)
 Scholl Canyon Landfill, located in Glendale, California
 Shoreline Park, Mountain View, now a city park
 Sunshine Canyon Landfill, Sylmar, California
 Toyon Canyon Landfill, Los Angeles, closed in 1985

Connecticut
 Laurel Park Incorporated, Naugatuck, closed in 1987

Florida

 Mount Trashmore, Broward County
 Munisport, North Miami, ceased operating in 1980

Georgia
 Grady Road Landfill
 Hercules 009 Landfill, Brunswick, a Superfund site
 Hickory Ridge Landfill, Conley
 Safeguard Landfill
 Taylor County Landfill

Illinois
 Mallard Lake Landfill, DuPage County

Indiana
 Randolph Farms Landfill, Modoc

Kentucky
 Glen Lily Landfill, Warren County

Louisiana
 Agriculture Street Landfill, New Orleans

Maine
 Juniper Ridge Landfill

Maryland
 Alpha Ridge Landfill, Marriottsville
 Carr's Mill Landfill, Howard County
 Scarboro Landfill, Harford County, used until 1986

Massachusetts

 Charles-George Reclamation Trust Landfill, Tyngsborough, a Superfund site
 Shpack Landfill, Norton, a Superfund site

Michigan
 Carleton Farms Landfill, Sumpter Township

Nevada
 Apex Landfill, Clark County

New Jersey
 Kin-Buc Landfill, Edison, a Superfund site
 Ringwood Mines landfill site, Ringwood, used until the early 1970s, a Superfund site
 Rolling Knolls Landfill, Chatham Township

New York
 Fountain Avenue and Pennsylvania Avenue Landfills, Brooklyn, former landfills
 Love Canal, Niagara Falls
 Pfohl Brothers Landfill, Cheektowaga, closed in 1971, a Superfund site
 Seneca Meadows Landfill, Seneca Falls
 Fresh Kills Landfill, Staten Island
 High Acres Landfill, Rochester
 Edgemere Landfill, Queens

North Carolina
 Highpoint C&D Landfill
 Red Rock Disposal Landfill
 Sampson County Landfill
 South Wake MSW LAndfill
 Warren County PCB Landfill, now closed

Ohio
 Krejci Dump, near Boston Heights, closed in 1986, a Superfund site
 Rumpke Sanitary Landfill, north of Cincinnati
 Tunnel Hill Reclamation Landfill, Subtitle D landfill in New Lexington, OH
Apex Environmental Resources, Amsterdam, OH

Rhode Island
 Central Landfill, in Johnston

South Carolina
 Curry Lake C&D Landfill
 L&L C&D Landfill
 Shiloh C&D Landfill

Tennessee
 Decatur Landfill

Vermont
 The Coventry, Vermont landfill is notable for being the only disposal site in the entire state. It is located near the Canadian border and near an international lake.

Virginia
 Mount Trashmore, Virginia Beach, closed in 1978

Washington
 Cedar Hills Regional Landfill, Maple Valley

See also
 Landfills in the United States
 Socrates Sculpture Park, Long Island City, an outdoor museum and public park built atop an abandoned landfill and illegal dumpsite
 Mount Trashmore Park, Virginia Beach, Virginia

References

External links